Ian Mai (born November 9, 2004) is an American soccer player who plays as a defender for USL Championship club San Diego Loyal.

Career

Youth
Born in California, Mai spent time among various academy teams in the area including Los Angeles FC, LA Galaxy, San Diego Surf.

San Diego Loyal
Ahead of the 2021 season, Mai signed an academy contract with USL Championship club San Diego Loyal following a successful trial. The academy contract would allow Mai to remain eligible to play college soccer.

On August 14, 2021, Mai made his professional debut for San Diego Loyal against Tacoma Defiance, coming on as an 81st minute substitute in the 1–2 defeat.

Career statistics

References

2004 births
Living people
American soccer players
Association football defenders
San Diego Loyal SC players
USL Championship players
Soccer players from California